Xylanimonas ulmi is a Gram-positive, aerobic, rod-shaped and non-motile bacterium from the genus Xylanimonas which has been isolated from decayed wood of the tree Ulmus nigra in Salamanca, Spain.

References

Further reading

External links
Type strain of Xylanibacterium ulmi at BacDive -  the Bacterial Diversity Metadatabase	

Micrococcales
Bacteria described in 2004